My Wild Irish Rose is a 1947 film directed by David Butler. It stars Dennis Morgan and Arlene Dahl (in her debut film). It was nominated for an Academy Award in 1948.

Plot
A fictionalized biopic of Chauncey Olcott, the movie traces the rise of an Irish-American tenor to stardom at the end of the 19th century and start of the 20th.

Soundtrack
Olcott's original composition of the same name was included in the film's music and was nominated for an Academy Award for Best Scoring of a Musical Picture.

Cast

 Dennis Morgan as Chauncey Olcott
 Arlene Dahl as Rose Donovan
 Andrea King as Lillian Russell
 Alan Hale Sr. as John Donovan
 George Tobias as Nick Popolis
 Ben Blue as Hopper
 George O'Brien as William "Duke" Muldoon
 William Frawley as William J. Scanlan

Box office
According to Warner Bros. records, the film earned $3,921,000 in the U.S. and $969,000 in other markets.

References

External links

 
 

1947 films
1940s biographical films
1940s historical musical films
American biographical films
American historical musical films
Biographical films about actors
Biographical films about musicians
Films about Irish-American culture
Films about music and musicians
Films directed by David Butler
Films scored by Max Steiner
Films scored by Ray Heindorf
Films set in New York City
Films set in the 19th century
Warner Bros. films
1940s English-language films
1940s American films